Tylopilus piniphilus is a bolete fungus in the family Boletaceae found in Yunnan, China, where it grows under the conifer species Pinus yunnanensis and P. densata.

References

External links

piniphilus
Fungi described in 1993
Fungi of China